Agua Blanca District is one of five districts of the province El Dorado in Peru.

References